Guy King (born 1977) is an Israeli-born blues and jazz guitarist and singer who now lives in Chicago, Illinois, United States. Guy King's playing style has been influenced by many jazz, soul and blues musicians which include B.B. King, and Albert King.

Early life
King was born and raised in Israel. He was exposed bossa nova and salsa as a child. At age 7 King played the clarinet, and at 10 years old, he was part of a conservatory orchestra. When he was 13, he began playing guitar.

At 16 he toured the United States with an Israeli singing group. King had to serve three years of compulsory military service in Israel. Just Twelve days after King was discharged from the military in 1999 (age 21), King moved to Memphis, Tennessee. After a short time in Memphis, King then moved to New Orleans before settling in Chicago.

Career

Willie Kent and His Gents 
King was in Chicago blues singer Willie Kent's band The Gents for six years, becoming Kent's bandleader. After Kent died, King for a time wanted to play less and declined an offer to lead the band. He subsequently began his solo career.

Solo career
King began his solo career in 2006. In 2009, King released his first solo album, Livin' It, and two more albums, I Am Who I Am And It Is What It Is and By Myself. In 2015, King signed with Delmark Records and Delmark released his 2016 album Truth. In 2021 he released the studio album Joy Is Coming.

Style and legacy
King is known for an unusual technique of plucking the strings with the side of his thumb. The way King holds his guitar and plucks the strings is similar to the jazz musician Wes Montgomery. His style which has been described as "eclectic".

Musical equipment

Guitars
 1982 Gibson ES-335TDN
 1982 Gibson ES-335TD

Amplifiers
 1966 Fender Pro Reverb
 Two-Rock amplifier

Discography
 Livin' It (2008)
 By Myself (2012
 I Am Who I Am and It Is What It Is (2012)
 Truth (2016)
 Joy Is Coming (2021)

Personal life
He is married to Sarah Marie Young.

See also
 Fingerstyle guitar
 Jazz guitar
 Chicago blues

References

External links
Guy King performing Drown in My Own Tears 2014
Guy King Band 2016
Guy King performing Happiness 
King and Sarah Marie Young My Happiness duet 2016
Guy King plays at Norman’s Rare Guitars 2017

1978 births
Living people
American male guitarists
Progressive rock guitarists
Musicians from Chicago
American blues guitarists
20th-century American guitarists
American blues singers
21st-century American male singers
21st-century American singers
Jewish songwriters
Blues guitarists
Israeli emigrants to the United States